The men's competition of the high diving events at the 2013 World Aquatics Championships was held on 29 and 31 July 2013. The competition was divided into five rounds with jumps of 27m.

Results
The first two rounds were held on July 29 at 16:00 and the final three rounds on July 31 at 16:00.

References

Men